Alchemilla heptagona is a species of plants belonging to the family Rosaceae.

It is native to Europe.

References

heptagona